Ricardo León Sánchez de Reinaldo (born July 3, 1958) is a Cuban-American journalist, radio host, and author. After working as the lead local anchor on Miami's WSVN, Sánchez moved to cable news, first as a daytime anchor at MSNBC, later at CNN, where he began as a correspondent and ultimately rose to become an anchor. On CNN, he hosted his own show Rick's List and served as a contributor to Anderson Cooper 360° and CNN International, where he frequently reported and translated between English and Spanish. Sánchez was fired from CNN on October 1, 2010, following controversial remarks he made on a radio program. In July 2011, Sánchez was hired by Florida International University, to serve as a color commentator for radio broadcasts of the school's football team. He worked as a columnist for Fox News and Fox News Latino, and a former correspondent for Spanish language network Mundo Fox. He hosted The News with Rick Sanchez on RT America for several years.

Early life
Sánchez was born in Guanabacoa, Cuba, a township of Havana, and emigrated to the United States with his parents at the age of two. He grew up in Hialeah, Florida, a suburb of Miami, and attended Mae M. Walters Elementary School, Henry H. Filer Middle School, and Hialeah High School, graduating in 1977. Sánchez accepted a football scholarship to Minnesota State University Moorhead and transferred to the University of Minnesota in Minneapolis on a CBS/WCCO Journalism Scholarship in 1979.

Of his childhood Sánchez has said: "I grew up not speaking English, dealing with real prejudice every day as a kid; watching my dad work in a factory, wash dishes, drive a truck, get spit on. I've been told that I can't do certain things in life simply because I was a Hispanic." He prefers to be called Rick Sánchez rather than use his birth name. He said in a newscast in 2009: "I want to be respectful of this wonderful country that allowed us as Hispanics to come here, and I think it's easier if someone's able to understand me by Anglicizing my name."

Career

First years
Sánchez began his broadcasting career at WCCO's satellite sister station KCMT (now KCCO-TV) in Alexandria, Minnesota, while still in college. He was hired at then-NBC affiliate WSVN (formerly WCKT) in Miami in 1982 and became a weekend anchor shortly thereafter. He won an Emmy Award in 1983 for his series titled When I left Cuba. In 1986, Sánchez left WSVN for CBS affiliate KHOU in Houston, then two years later, he returned to WSVN and began an afternoon anchor position with the station, which would switch its affiliation to Fox the following year. Sánchez was hired at MSNBC in 2001. In 2003, Sánchez left MSNBC to return to the Miami/Ft. Lauderdale TV market, where he hosted a local talk show on WTVJ. Sánchez later anchored on then-WB affiliated WBZL (now WSFL) until he joined CNN.

CNN anchor
Sánchez joined CNN in 2004. At CNN, Sánchez filed domestic and international reports.  On January 18, 2010, he began to host his own two-hour show in the afternoons, Rick's List, where he invited viewers to share their opinions and questions via social media. His use of social networking tools to create a citizen-driven news program was recognized by the Newseum in Washington, D.C.

Termination and aftermath
On September 30, 2010, Sánchez was interviewed on Sirius XM's radio show Stand Up With Pete Dominick. Sánchez's interview occurred on the final day of his show in the 8 p.m. time slot, and he was reported to be angry about being replaced by CNN's new Parker Spitzer talk show as well as occasional The Daily Show jokes made at his expense:

After Dominick questioned him, Sánchez retracted the term, "bigot," and referred to Stewart as "prejudicial" and "uninformed," but he defended feeling discriminated, saying, "He's upset that someone of my ilk is almost at his level" and that Stewart is "not just a comedian. He can make and break careers."  When queried on the issue of whether Stewart likewise belonged to a minority group on account of his Jewish faith, Sánchez responded:

A day after his remarks, CNN announced that Sánchez was no longer employed with the company.

Certain accounts suggest Sánchez's departure was motivated by other reasons. CNN president Jonathan Klein, who was a supporter of Sánchez and had given him increased air time, was fired just one week before Sánchez, leading some to believe that Sánchez's firing may have been motivated by other reasons in addition to the comments. A contributor to New York magazine wrote: "The rumor that Sánchez was already on his way out in the wake of former CNN president Jonathan Klein's ouster from the company has been circling the Sánchez story."

During his time at CNN, Sánchez once called President Barack Obama a "cotton-picking president", a remark for which he apologized, explaining that he had grown up in the South where the phrase was a colloquialism. He had also falsely attributed quotes to Rush Limbaugh, for which he also later apologized.

Despite his firing, upon leaving CNN, Sánchez said, "I want to go on record to say that I have nothing but the highest regard for CNN and for my six wonderful years with them. I appreciate every opportunity that they have given me, and it has been a wonderful experience working for them."

In the days after the incident, Sánchez apologized several times. In an appearance on Good Morning America, Sánchez told George Stephanopoulos: "I said some things I shouldn't have said. They were wrong. Not only were they wrong, they were offensive." He added, "I apologize and it was wrong for me to be so careless and so inartful. ... But it happened and I can’t take it back and, you know what, now I have to stand up and be responsible."

Sánchez personally apologized to Stewart. He released a statement expressing regret for his "inartful" comments, adding "I am very much opposed to hate and intolerance, in any form, and I have frequently spoken out against prejudice." On October 20, 2010, Jon Stewart told Larry King that Sánchez should not have been fired for what Sánchez said in the radio interview; Stewart called the firing "absolute insanity", and stating that he was not "personally hurt".

In a letter to Abraham Foxman, the head of the Anti-Defamation League (ADL), Sánchez apologized once again, writing, "[T]here are no words strong enough for me to express my regret and sorrow over what I said. It was offensive, and I deeply, sincerely and unequivocally apologize for the hurt that I have caused. I tell my children that when they make a mistake, they should take responsibility, atone and work to repair whatever they have done. ... I cannot undo the offense or controversy I caused; all I can do is to try and learn from this experience and strive to become a better person."

Following a meeting with Foxman, Foxman said Sánchez can now "put the matter to rest", adding that he hoped Sánchez can now move on with his life and work.

In late 2010, Orthodox Rabbi Shmuley Boteach held a public event at Manhattan's Carlebach Synagogue with Sánchez, and commented: "Our community has enough problems without looking for anti-Semitism where it doesn't exist. Rick Sánchez was humiliated and his reputation dragged through the mud. ... The Jewish religion says that a man's most cherished possession is his good name. Rick deserves the opportunity to reclaim his." Sánchez and Rabbi Boteach spoke for nearly two hours.

In 2011, Sánchez visited Israel as part of an ADL-sponsored trip for Latino journalists. Sánchez spoke at the ADL's National Executive Committee Meeting in 2012, where Sánchez recounted, "the long and unexpected voyage ... [and] personal journey that led me to a man I now call a friend: Abe Foxman, who has led me to know myself and led me to grow in unexpected ways."

Radio football announcer
On July 27, 2011, The Washington Post reported that Sánchez had started a job as a radio announcer for Florida International University. Starting in September 2011, Sánchez provided analysis of the FIU football team.

Fox News and Radio engagements
Rick Sánchez returned to cable news as a columnist on Fox News Latino in September 2012. Sánchez was offered a short term employment with the website. Since joining Fox News Latino, he has appeared on the Fox News Channel as a contributor. He also started as a news contributor for MundoFox at the end of 2012. In 2013, Sánchez returned to South Florida with a weekday show on Clear Channel-owned Newsradio 610 WIOD. Replacing Todd Schnitt in afternoon drive time, Sánchez did a stint on a morning show, that led into The Rush Limbaugh Show. Due to low ratings, the show was eventually cancelled.

Family life
Sánchez and his wife, Suzanne, have three sons and one daughter.

DUI incident
On December 10, 1990, Sánchez, driving home, struck a man who jumped into the path of Sánchez's car. The man became paralyzed after being hit.

Sánchez was not charged with causing the accident; however, he was charged with driving under the influence (DUI) and pleaded no contest.

References

External links
 

1958 births
American bloggers
American television reporters and correspondents
American people of Cuban descent
College football announcers
American male journalists
Cuban refugees
Television anchors from Miami
Fox News people
Living people
Writers from Atlanta
People from Douglas County, Minnesota
People from Havana
Writers from Houston
Writers from Miami
University of Minnesota School of Journalism and Mass Communication alumni
CNN people
RT (TV network) people
Radio personalities from Miami
21st-century American non-fiction writers
American male bloggers